The Little Clowns of Happytown is an American animated television series that aired as part of ABC's Saturday morning lineup from September 26, 1987 to July 16, 1988.

Plot
The series is set around young clowns from Happytown, whose goal is to spread happiness and imbue positive mental attitudes to the city next door. The young clowns are Big Top (the leader), Badum-Bump (Big Top's little brother), Hiccup (Big Top's helper), Tickles (Hiccup's best friend), Pranky (Big Top's best friend), and Blooper (Hiccup's big brother), along with their pet elephant, Rover, and their mentor, Mr. Pickleherring. They are also accompanied by the clownimals, clown-like animals that only Badum-Bump can understand. The only thing that stands in their way is Awful B. Bad and his minions, Geek and Whiner.

Characters
Big Top - The main protagonist and leader of the Little Clowns. He loves to tell jokes. He wears a top hat in the style of a Ringmaster.

Blooper - He's a clumsy clown that does physical comedy. He is also involved in many acts by accident.

Hiccup - She is Blooper's younger sister. She loves to sing songs but often hiccups when she talks.

Tickles - She loves to giggle and can fix anything.

Pranky - He loves to prank people by throwing custard pies at them only sometimes he gets them in his face by accident.

Badum-Bump - Big Top's younger brother and he only speaks by making sounds.

Rover - Badum-Bump's pet elephant and partner.

Clownimals - The colorful clown-like animals that accompanies the little clowns. Badum-Bump is the only one who understands them. There is 9 of them. Lion, Tiger, Bear, Seal, Penguin, Giraffe, Rhino, Zebra and a Kangaroo.

Mr. Pickleherring - The kids' enthusiastic teacher often teaches them how to be funny and helps with their morals.

Awful B. Bad - He's the main antagonist. He is also a man who wants the world to be gloomy just like him.

Geek - Bebad's redheaded assistant.

Whiner - Bebad's other assistant. A teenager who whines and often informs Bebad on what's going on.

Cast
 Sue Blu as Hiccup
 Charlie Adler as Pranky and Awful B. Bad (in some episodes)
 Danny Cooksey as Big Top
 Frank Welker as Badum-Bump, Rover the Elephant, Clownimals
 Ron Palillo as Whiner
 Pat Fraley as Awful B. Bad, Geek
 Josh Rodine as Blooper
 Ellen Gerstell as Tickles
 Howard Morris as Mr. Pickleherring

Production
Marvel Productions and ABC had brought in consulting company Q5 Corporation to help develop the show along with other series for the 1987–1988 season. Q5's consultants consist of psychology PhDs and advertising, marketing and research professionals. Marvel had already used Q5 to develop their Defenders of the Earth series, so ABC brought them in for the 1987–88 season to improve its kid appeal on its Saturday morning offerings to get out of third place in the ratings.

A Little Clowns former story editor indicated in September 1987 to the Los Angeles Times regarding Q5 consulting on the series:
They aren't merely researching trends; they're trying to engage in social engineering. There's absolutely no passion with these people. There is no sense of honor, of anger, of deep emotion, of love. They're bland-izers; they try to hammer out all of the high and low points of being a human being. I can see we're not doing Dostoevsky on Saturday morning, but there has to be some leeway to create characters who are free to express themselves.

Fred Wolf and his Murakami Wolf Swenson were also brought in to produce the series.

The show was promoted as a part of the third annual ABC Family Fun Fair, which brought the voice talent of the characters to perform highlights of their show. The show stopped in Oklahoma City from Friday August 28 through Sunday August 30, 1987.

Episodes

Reception
The Los Angeles Times was critical of the show, with writer Charles Solomon saying that younger kids should have skipped it by staying in bed. They also claimed that the show was predictable and copied the Smurfs heavily, including using "clown" as a general word substitute.

Joking Around with the Little Clowns
During the show's run, ABC aired a series of short segments called Joking Around with the Little Clowns, which ran during the commercial breaks of their other Saturday morning programming and featured one of the clowns telling another a joke. Although Little Clowns of Happytown was cancelled after a single season, the Joking Around with the Little Clowns segments continued to run on ABC for another two years.

Home releases
In the United Kingdom, several volumes of Little Clowns of Happytown were released on VHS by Tempo Video in 1988, each containing three episodes. A compilation video of the Joking Around With the Little Clowns segments was later released in the United States by Strand-VCI Entertainment in 1991.

Years later, in 2014, several episodes of the series were released on DVD in Region 1 as part of the Mill Creek Entertainment compilation TV Guide Spotlight: Totally '80s Toons which also includes Heathcliff, The Littles, Dennis the Menace, The Get Along Gang, Care Bears and Nellie the Elephant.

References

External links
 
 Little Clowns of Happytown at TVBuzer.com

1980s American animated television series
1987 American television series debuts
1988 American television series endings
American children's animated adventure television series
American children's animated comedy television series
American Broadcasting Company original programming
Animated television series about children
Fictional clowns
Television series by DHX Media
Television series by Marvel Productions
Television shows about clowns